Nika Barič (born 2 September 1992) is a Slovenian basketball player who currently plays for Çukurova Basketbol. She was selected in the second round of the 2012 WNBA Draft (20th overall) by the Minnesota Lynx.

References

1992 births
Living people
Minnesota Lynx draft picks
People from Trbovlje
Point guards
Slovenian expatriate basketball people in Russia
Slovenian women's basketball players